Human Desires is a 1924 British silent romance film directed by Burton George and starring Marjorie Daw, Clive Brook and Juliette Compton. It is also known by the alternative title of Love's Bargain.

Plot
As described in a film magazine review, Joan Thayer, ambitious for a stage career, becomes a wife in name only to Georges Gautier, a wealthy and influential banker. She loves the young poet Henri Regnier, but he fears to ask her to marry him because of his poverty. She cannot learn to care for her husband, and a former mistress of Georges' complicates things. When Georges realizes that Joan does not care for him, he secures a divorce. Joan gives up her stage ambitions and marries her poet, while the husband is left with his memories.

Cast
 Marjorie Daw as Joan Thayer 
 Clive Brook as Georges Gautier  
 Juliette Compton as Andree de Vigne  
 Warwick Ward as Pierre Brandon 
 Russell Thorndike as Paul Perot  
 Jean de Limur as Henri Regnier

References

Bibliography
 Low, Rachel. The History of British Film: Volume IV, 1918–1929. Routledge, 1997.

External links

1924 films
British romance films
British silent feature films
1920s romance films
Films set in Paris
British black-and-white films
1920s English-language films
Films directed by Burton George
1920s British films